Most of the Victoria Islands are named for Queen Victoria by British explorers or by others, and may refer to:

Argentina
 Victoria Island (Argentina), in the Nahuel Huapi National Park

Canada
 Victoria Island in the Arctic, the eighth-largest island in the world and shared between the Northwest Territories and Nunavut
 Victoria Island (Pugwash River), Nova Scotia
 Victoria Island (Amadjuak Lake), Nunavut
 Victoria Island (Charleston Lake), Ontario
 Victoria Island (Georgian Bay), Ontario
 Victoria Island (Gull Lake), Ontario
 Victoria Island (Harris Lake), Ontario
 Victoria Island (Lac des Chats), Ontario
 Victoria Island (Lake Muskoka), Ontario
 Victoria Island (Lake Nipigon), Ontario
 Victoria Island (Lake Nipissing), Ontario
 Victoria Island (Lake of the Woods), Ontario
 Victoria Island (Lake Superior), Ontario
 Victoria Island (Ottawa River), Ontario
 Victoria Island (Round Lake), Ontario
 Victoria Island (St. Lawrence River), Ontario

Chile
 Victoria Island (Chile)

Malaysia
 Victoria Island, alternate name for Labuan

Nigeria
 Victoria Island, Lagos

Pacific Ocean
 Victoria Island (Pacific), a phantom island reported at 6°45'S, 160°42′W

Russia
 Victoria Island (Russia), named for British steam yacht Victoria that sailed nearby

United States
 Victoria Island (California), United States
 Victoria Island structure, impact crater near Stockton, California

Other
 Victoria Island, a fictional island in the MMORPG MapleStory
Hong Kong Island, unofficial name, is home to the territory's capital Victoria City, Victoria Peak and nearby Victoria Harbour

References